Ten Gentlemen from West Point is a 1942 American Western film directed by Henry Hathaway and starring George Montgomery, Maureen O'Hara and John Sutton. Its cinematography was nominated for an Academy Award in 1943. George Montgomery replaced John Payne who was suffering an emotional upset at the time. The story tell a fictional story of the first class of the United States Military Academy in the early 1800s.

Plot
In the early 19th century, West Point Military Academy opens despite some doubting its worth - including the officer in charge, Sam Carter. A number of men enlist in the first class, including rich Howard Shelton and Kentucky backwoodsman Joe Dawson. The men are initially antagonistic towards each other, especially when Joe falls for Howard's fiance, Carolyn Brainbridge.

The men take part in the war against Tecumseh with William Henry Harrison.

Cast

 George Montgomery as Joe Dawson
 Maureen O'Hara as Carolyn Brainbridge
 John Sutton as Howard Shelton
 Laird Cregar as Maj. Sam Carter
 Shepperd Strudwick as Henry Clay (as John Shepperd)
 Victor Francen as Florimond Massey
 Harry Davenport as Bane
 Ward Bond as Sgt. Scully
 Douglass Dumbrille as Gen. William Henry Harrison
 Ralph Byrd as Maloney
 Joe Brown Jr. as Benny Havens
 David Bacon as Shippen 
 Esther Dale as Mrs. Thompson
 Richard Derr as Chester
 Louis Jean Heydt as Jared Danforth
 Stanley Andrews as Captain Sloane
 James Flavin as Captain Luddy
 Edna Mae Jones as Letty
 Charles Trowbridge as Senate president
 Tully Marshall as Grandpa
 Edwin Maxwell as Sen. John Randolph
 Uno as Old Put (dog)
 Edward Fielding as William Eustis
 Morris Ankrum as Wood
 Selmer Jackson as Sersen
 Noble Johnson as Tecumseh
 Eddie Dunn as O'Toole
 Frank Ferguson as Alden Brown

Production
The film was originally called School for Soldiers. It was meant to star Tyrone Power, then was given to Henry Fonda and John Payne. Henry Hathaway signed to direct and Ben Hecht was bought on to rewrite the script. Eventually Fonda and Payne withdrew and were replaced by George Montgomery and Randolph Scott. Maureen O'Hara and Victor Mature were meant to play other roles. Eventually John Payne replaced Randolph Scott - but then John Sutton replaced Payne.

The costumes were designed by Dolly Tree.

Reception
The film recorded a loss of $89,000.

See also
 List of American films of 1942

References

External links
 
 
 

1942 films
American black-and-white films
1940s English-language films
Films directed by Henry Hathaway
Films set in the United States Military Academy
20th Century Fox films
Films with screenplays by Richard Maibaum
American Western (genre) films
1942 Western (genre) films
Films produced by William Perlberg
1940s American films